Manuel António Marques Machado (born 4 December 1955) is a Portuguese football manager.

Football career
Born in the village of Oliveira, in Guimarães, Machado started his career with his local Vitória de Guimarães' youths, having a head coach spell with lowly S.C. Vila Real in between. After two years with another modest club in the north, AD Fafe, he moved to another side in his region, Moreirense FC, helping to promotion from the third division to the Primeira Liga in just two years.

Machado then coached Moreirense to a comfortable 12th position in their debut season, finishing ninth the following campaign, after which he returned to Guimarães. He signed for C.D. Nacional subsequently, helping the Madeirans to finish a best-ever fifth, with qualification for the UEFA Cup. After almost two years at Académica de Coimbra he joined S.C. Braga, where he did not meet the expectations of a UEFA Cup place, thus resigning in April 2008.

Machado rejoined Nacional for 2008–09, bettering the club's best-ever finish as fourth. However, on 13 December 2009, he announced he would leave the benches for a period, after surgery-related complications; he was replaced by assistant Predrag Jokanović, and eventually left his post at the end of the campaign, replaced by precisely the Serbian.

On 2 June 2010, Machado returned to Vitória Guimarães, taking the Minho team to the final of the Taça de Portugal in his first season. On 26 August 2011, he left the Estádio D. Afonso Henriques after Europa League elimination at the hands of Atlético Madrid (6–0 on aggregate, 4–0 home loss in the second game).

Machado signed with Nacional for a third spell on 13 October 2012, replacing the fired Pedro Caixinha. A contract termination by mutual consent was reached on 28 December 2016, as the team ranked third-bottom in the league and tied for points with the first side inside the relegation zone, having also been ousted from the Portuguese Cup. He was also relieved of his duties at F.C. Arouca on 21 March 2017, becoming the first manager to be fired by two teams in the season, as both eventually dropped down a tier.

On 27 May 2017, Machado signed a one-year contract with former club Moreirense. On 29 October, as they were placed second from the bottom in the top division, he was dismissed.

In April 2020, Machado was named as manager of local third tier club Berço SC for the upcoming season. Eleven months later, he activated a clause allowing him to move freely to a top-flight club, and returned to relegation-threatened Nacional.

Managerial statistics

Honours
Moreirense
Segunda Liga: 2001–02
Segunda Divisão: 2000–01

Vitória Guimarães
Taça de Portugal runner-up: 2010–11
Supertaça Cândido de Oliveira runner-up: 2011

References

External links

1955 births
Living people
Sportspeople from Guimarães
Portuguese football managers
Primeira Liga managers
Liga Portugal 2 managers
Moreirense F.C. managers
Vitória S.C. managers
C.D. Nacional managers
Associação Académica de Coimbra – O.A.F. managers
S.C. Braga managers
Super League Greece managers
Aris Thessaloniki F.C. managers
Portuguese expatriate football managers
Expatriate football managers in Greece
Portuguese expatriate sportspeople in Greece